Peter A. Daempfle (born 1970) is an American educator and author in the field of popular science. He currently teaches biology at SUNY Delhi.

Biography

Early life and education

Daempfle was born in Ridgewood, Queens, New York, May 5. 1970, a child of German refugees. He was class valedictorian at Forest Hills High School in 1988. He earned a B.A. in Biology from Hartwick College, an M.S. in Biology from University at Albany, an M.S. in Education from The College of Saint Rose, and a Ph.D. in Biology Education from University at Albany.

Career
From 2001–2009 he was a science advisor to the George W. Bush Administration's No Child Left Behind Act (NCLB). He is known for publications in science and on studying the high school-college science "divide." Daempfle has authored numerous books and articles. He is notable for college biology textbooks and books about science in the popular culture.

Skepticism

Daempfle is the author of Good Science, Bad Science, Pseudoscience, and Just Plain Bunk: How to Tell the Difference (2013).

Book Publications

Science and Society: Scientific Thought and Education for the 21st Century, 1st ed. (2012) Jones and Bartlett Learning: Burlington, MA.
Good Science, Bad Science, Pseudoscience, and Just Plain Bunk: How to Tell the Difference. 1st ed. (2013) Rowman and Littlefield Publishers, MD.
Essential Biology, 1st ed. (2016), Kendall/Hunt Publishers.

Research Articles
Faculty Assumptions about the Student Characteristics Required for Success in Introductory College Biology. Bioscene, v. 28 n. 4 pp. 19–33 Dec 2002
An Analysis of the High Attrition Rates among First Year College Science, Math, and Engineering Majors. Journal of College Student Retention, v. 5 n. 1 pp. 37–52 2003–2004
The Effects of Instructional Approaches on the Improvement of Reasoning in Introductory College Biology: A Quantitative Review of Research. Bioscene, v. 32 n. 4 pp. 22–31 Dec 2006

References

External links
Peter Daempfle Interviewed on the Importance of Science and Education

1970 births
American skeptics
Hartwick College alumni
Living people
State University of New York at Delhi faculty
College of Saint Rose alumni
University at Albany, SUNY alumni
Forest Hills High School (New York) alumni
People from Ridgewood, Queens